Bosnia and Herzegovina competed at the 2015 World Championships in Athletics in Beijing, China, from 22–30 August 2015.

Medalists

Results

Men
Track and road events

Field events

See also
 Bosnia and Herzegovina at the World Championships in Athletics

Sources 

Nations at the 2015 World Championships in Athletics
World Championships in Athletics
2015